Francis Meynieu (born 9 January 1953 in Bordeaux) is a French retired professional football defender.

External links
Profile on French federation official site

1953 births
Footballers from Bordeaux
Living people
French footballers
France international footballers
Association football defenders
FC Girondins de Bordeaux players
Tours FC players
Ligue 1 players
Olympic footballers of France
Footballers at the 1976 Summer Olympics